The Mrs. I. L. Crego House is a historic house located at 7979 Crego Road in Baldwinsville, Onondaga County, New York.

Description and history 
It is credited to architect Archimedes Russell and was built in 1870. It is a two-story, brick Italianate style dwelling. It consists of a main block and rear wing with low hipped roofs. It features a full width, one-story front porch and small side porch with chamfered columns.

It was listed on the National Register of Historic Places on June 27, 2007.

References

External links

Houses on the National Register of Historic Places in New York (state)
Italianate architecture in New York (state)
Houses completed in 1870
National Register of Historic Places in Onondaga County, New York
Houses in Onondaga County, New York